Saradish Roy (1918-1985) was an Indian politician. He was elected to the Lok Sabha, lower house of the Parliament of India from Bolpur, West Bengal in 1971,1977,1980 and 1984 as member of the Communist Party of India (Marxist) .He was earlier elected from Katwa, West Bengal in 1962 as a member of the Communist Party of India. As per the request of the local people in his native place, for a railway communication from Suri to Howrah, Kolkata, it had been his effort and initiative the train 53045/53046 Mayurakkhi Passenger, now 13045/13046 Mayurakkhi Express was introduced.

References

External links
 Official biographical sketch in Parliament of India website

1918 births
India MPs 1962–1967
India MPs 1971–1977
India MPs 1977–1979
India MPs 1980–1984
India MPs 1984–1989
Lok Sabha members from West Bengal
1985 deaths
Communist Party of India politicians from West Bengal
Communist Party of India (Marxist) politicians
People from Birbhum district
People from Purba Bardhaman district